Eurytrachelus is a subgenus of the ground beetle genus Bembidion. Sometimes included in Bembidion (Odontium), it is endemic to Europe.

The stag beetle genus invalidly named Eurytrachelus by Thomson in 1862 is now included in Serrognathus.

Species include:
Bembidion laticolle

External links
Eurytrachelus at Fauna Europaea

Trechinae
Insect subgenera